The Rossendale Weavers', Winders' and Beamers' Association was a trade union representing cotton industry workers in the Rossendale area of Lancashire in England.

The union was founded in 1873, and affiliated to the North East Lancashire Amalgamated Weavers' Association in 1877. It left this "First Amalgamation" in 1880 and remained unaffiliated until 1892, when it belatedly joined the Amalgamated Weavers' Association.

By the 1890s, the union had more than 1,500 members, and this continued to grow, reaching 2,800 in 1907 before falling back a little to 2,000 by 1920. Thereafter, it declined in line with employment in the Lancashire textile trade, falling to only 1,020 in 1960. That year, the Haslingden Weavers' Association merged in, the union relocating its office to Haslingden, and renamed itself as the Rossendale Valley Textile Workers' Association, membership recovering to 2,555.

In 1977, the union merged into the Burnley, Nelson and District Textile Workers' Union, which accordingly renamed itself as the Burnley, Nelson, Rossendale and District Textile Workers' Union.

General Secretaries
J. Wright
1890s: John Farron
1926: Albert Lomax
1960: Mary Abbott

References

Defunct trade unions of the United Kingdom
Borough of Rossendale
Cotton industry trade unions
1873 establishments in the United Kingdom
1977 disestablishments in the United Kingdom
Trade unions established in 1873
Trade unions disestablished in 1977
Trade unions based in Lancashire